The Debaters is a Canadian radio comedy show hosted by Steve Patterson. It airs on CBC Radio One, Saturdays at 1:30PM and Wednesdays at 11:30AM, Eastern Time.

During each episode, two debates take place between two sets of two contestants. The topics are deliberately comedic, including "Apples are better than oranges" and "Darth Vader was a bad father". The winner is chosen by audience reaction at the end of the debate. Each season has approximately 33 new episodes. These are recorded in front of live audiences in studios, theatres and clubs across Canada.

In 2011, the radio series also taped a number of episodes for broadcast as a television series on CBC Television, but did not get a second season.

History
The show was created by Richard Side and was first broadcast in September 2006, replacing the long-running comedy show Madly Off in All Directions. It was produced by Side, along with Phillip Ditchburn and Anna Bonokoski.

Whereas the first season was entirely hosted by Shaun Majumder, the second season featured a succession of guest hosts, including Sean Cullen, Elvira Kurt, Patrick McKenna, and Roman Danylo. As of the third season, the regular host of the show is Steve Patterson.

Performers who have appeared on the show include Irwin Barker, Ian Boothby, Sean Cullen, Charles Demers, Gary Jones, Deborah Kimmett, Andy Kindler, Patrick Ledwell, Marc Maron, Patrick McKenna, Mark Meer, Darcy Michael, Greg Proops, Lara Rae, Simon Rakoff, Dan Redican, Derek Seguin, Erica Sigurdson, Ron Sparks, Scott Thompson and Mary Walsh.

In 2011, the series also taped a number of episodes for broadcast as a television series on CBC Television, but did not get a second season.

Format 
Each show is 30 minutes in length, and consists of two 15-minute debates. Two stand-up comedians are given a topical and sometimes complex matter to debate. One serves as advocate: the other takes the contrary view. The live audience ultimately decides who won the debate, based on a mix of "funny and fact", by applauding for the performer they thought did the best job. The comedian that gets the loudest round of applause wins.

There are four rounds to each debate: the first allows the comedian to state their position on the issue, which is followed by the "bare-knuckle round" where the two debaters spar with each other directly. This is followed by the "firing line" round where the host quizzes the debaters on their knowledge of the subject (where they can either provide the correct or most amusing answer), concluded by a one-minute summation. The live audience then votes by applauding for who they thought had the best combination of "laughs and logic".

Episodes

Awards 

 The "Monotheism vs. Polytheism" debate featuring Ron Sparks and Sean Cullen won the 2010 Canadian Comedy Award for Best Program or Clip.
 The "William Shatner is Canada's Greatest Actor" debate featuring Cullen and Eric Peterson also won the same award, in 2015. That episode is also one of the only double length debates (just one debate for the entire episode).
 The show has also received several other Canadian Comedy Award nominations for both the radio and television series.

See also 
 Lewis Black's Root of All Evil - US comedy debate show
 Argumental - British comedy debate show

References

External links
 Official CBC listing for the show

2006 radio programme debuts
CBC Radio One programs
Canadian comedy radio programs
2011 Canadian television series debuts
CBC Television original programming
2012 Canadian television series endings
Radio programs adapted into television shows
Debates
2010s Canadian comedy television series
Canadian stand-up comedy television series
Canadian Comedy Award winners